Kalamandalam Hyderali  is a 2020 Indian Malayalam-language drama film written by Dr.Aju K.Narayanan and directed by Kiran G.nath, starring Paris Laxmi, Renji Panicker, T.G. Ravi and Ashokan. The film is produced by vinesh Mohan under the production house Vedhas creations LLP. Music is composed by Kottakkal Madhu and Anil Gopalan  cinematography is done by M. J. Radhakrishnan

Cast 
 Renji Panicker as Kalamandalam Hyderali
 Paris Laxmi as Hafsa 
 T.G. Ravi as Moidooty
 Ashokan as Kalamandalam Sankaran Embranthiri

Production
The film took two years to complete including research and shoot. Shooting completed in three locations with five schedules and more than two hundred artists

Music

References

External links 
 

2020 films
Indian drama films
2020s Malayalam-language films
2020 drama films